Olaug Svarva (born 21 December 1957) is a Norwegian financial analyst and former CEO of the Government Pension Fund of Norway.

Svarva was born in Steinkjer. She graduated with a degree in economics from the University of Denver. From 1985 to 1988, she worked as a financial analyst for Den norske Creditbank and later for the Carnegie Investment Bank. She was appointed to a position at the Government Pension Fund of Norway (Folketrygdfondet) in 1991, and then she served as its Chief executive officer from 2006 to 2018.

References

1957 births
Living people
People from Steinkjer
Norwegian expatriates in the United States
University of Denver alumni
Norwegian economists
Norwegian women economists
Financial analysts